"I Will Never Be a Star" is a single by the Norwegian duo Ylvis, although it was the brothers' little brother, Bjarte Ylvisåker, who sang the song. It was uploaded onto YouTube on October 14, 2014, and had over 7.3 million views . In the song Bjarte sings about living in the shadow of his two older brothers' success. The song was released as a part of Ylvis' TV show I kveld med YLVIS on TVNorge.

Live performances 
The song was performed live during concerts given in 2014 in Norway as a part of Ylvis' The Expensive Jacket Tour.

Awards
The song has won Best Artist Performance award at the 2015 Nordic Music Video Awards.

References

2014 songs
Comedy songs
Electronic songs
Ylvis songs